Lindmania phelpsiae is a plant species in the genus Lindmania. This species is endemic to Venezuela.

References

phelpsiae
Flora of Venezuela